The Rukumoana Marae is a marae located between the towns of Morrinsville and Kiwitahi. It was built between 1915 and 1917 and used as a parliament house during the Māori King Movement.

References

Marae in New Zealand
Morrinsville
1910s architecture in New Zealand